T. Creighton Jones was the Presiding Bishop of the Orthodox Anglican Church and Metropolitan Archbishop of the Orthodox Anglican Communion. His apostolic succession is Anglican, Old Catholic, and Orthodox. He was the fifth archbishop to lead the Orthodox Anglican Communion and the Orthodox Anglican Church.

In 2012, Scott McLaughlin announced his retirement and nominated Jones as his successor. This nomination was confirmed by a vote of the General Convention of the Orthodox Anglican Church on June 9, 2012.  Jones also served as the chancellor of Saint Andrew's Theological College and Seminary from 2012 to 2015.

On November 16, 2014, Jones announced his retirement and nominated his suffragan, Thomas E. Gordon, to be his successor. His retirement was effective on April 18, 2015.

References

External links
Orthodox Anglican Church website
Orthodox Anglican Communion website

Year of birth missing (living people)
Presiding Bishops of the Anglican Orthodox Church
Living people
21st-century Anglican archbishops
21st-century American clergy